Most Tibetan Buddhist monasteries, temples and other religious structures in the Himalayas were decorated with Tibetan Buddhist wall paintings.  Despite much destruction in Tibet itself, many of these survive, the dry climate of the Tibetan plateau assisting their survival, as the wet Indian climate has reduced survival of paintings from there.  There are some regional differences, but the techniques described here cover the traditional wall paintings across this area. The wall paintings were executed on earthen plaster with the secco-technique. A secco-technique is a painting technique in which the pigments with their binder are employed to paint onto a dry (Italian: secco) wall.

Painting technique

The support for wall paintings is made of earthen plaster, usually consisting of more than one layer of earthen plaster, in which the last layer was rendered as smoothly as possible.
The support was covered by a smoothened ground, generally in white. Materials employed for the ground may be kaolin, chalk or gypsum, or any other white material deriving from an inert mineral. 
To organise the painting, preliminary sketches were carried out. Generally this involved  the geometric layout of the design with the help of snapped lines and/or rulers. Compasses were employed mainly for the construction of mandalas. Figures were roughly sketched, and then rendered with precise  contours. These outlines are usually in black. Repetitive designs were in some cases achieved with the use of stencils.

Traditionally, colour codes were employed to accelerate and simplify the colouring of the various ornaments and figures. For this purpose each section was given a number from 1-9 or an abbreviation of the name of the colour. Specific details were then achieved with small paint brushes employing a variety of colours: black, white, ochre or red.

Specific ornaments of a representation were  enriched with gold. This  was either applied as a gold leaf or as powder in a binder.

Notes

Further reading
 
von Schroeder, Ulrich. 2006. Empowered Masters: Tibetan Wall Paintings of Mahasiddhas at Gyantse. (p. 224 pages with 91 colour illustrations). Chicago: Serindia Publications. 

Buddhist temples in Tibet
Tibetan art
Tibetan painting
Buddhist paintings